Diana Karina Velázquez Ramírez (born 13 June 1970) is a Mexican politician affiliated with the PRI. In 2013, she served as Deputy of the LXII Legislature of the Mexican Congress representing Chihuahua.

References

1970 births
Living people
People from Chihuahua (state)
Women members of the Chamber of Deputies (Mexico)
Institutional Revolutionary Party politicians
21st-century Mexican politicians
21st-century Mexican women politicians
Deputies of the LXII Legislature of Mexico
Members of the Chamber of Deputies (Mexico) for Chihuahua (state)